Sunsong is an anthology series of secondary school textbooks published by Longman Caribbean, from 1987. The last book in the series, Sunsong: Tide Rising has been discontinued, but the Books 1-3 remain in use in Caribbean schools. The books consist of a vast selection of poems from some of the literary genre's most famous writers, from the Caribbean and abroad.

The books' editors were Pamela Mordecai and Grace Walker Gordon.

Books in the series
Sunsong 1
Sunsong 2
Sunsong 3
Sunsong: Tide Rising

External links
Official site at Pearson Education

Publications established in 1987
Poetry anthologies
Caribbean literature